The Desire of the Moth is a 1917 American silent Western film directed by Rupert Julian and starring Ruth Clifford, Monroe Salisbury and W.H. Bainbridge.

Cast
 Ruth Clifford as Stella Vorhis
 Monroe Salisbury as Christopher Roy
 W.H. Bainbridge as Col. Vorhis
 Rupert Julian as John Wesley Pringle
 Milton Brown as Matt Lisner
 Allan Sears as Dick Marr

References

Bibliography
 Paul C. Spehr & Gunnar Lundquist. American Film Personnel and Company Credits, 1908-1920. McFarland, 1996.

External links
 

1917 films
1917 Western (genre) films
American black-and-white films
Universal Pictures films
Films directed by Rupert Julian
Silent American Western (genre) films
1910s English-language films
1910s American films